Parolinia ornata is a species of flowering plants in the family Brassicaceae.

References

 The Plant List entry
 Encyclopedia of Life entry

Brassicaceae